Sato is an unincorporated community in Ora Township, Jackson County, Illinois, United States.

References

Unincorporated communities in Jackson County, Illinois
Unincorporated communities in Illinois